Steven Rooke is an Australian actor who has performed on stage, in films and television.

Education 
Rooke graduated from Noosa District State High School in 1996, and received a Bachelor of Fine Arts (Acting) from the Queensland University of Technology in 2000.

Career 
Rooke joined theatre company Shake and Stir as a  Masterclass instructor.

Reviews 
In Aussie Theatre Bobbie-Lea Dionysius wrote of Rooke's performance in Gasp! that he was, " enjoyable to watch as always".

Rooke's performance in Gloria was reviewed as, Having come into the rehearsal period as a late replacement, Rooke did a great job fitting into the cast. Rooke always has a strong presence onstage and is enjoyable to watch. However, the role felt quite stifling for the actor capable of so much moreSonny Clarke wrote of Rooke in Kelly "the night really belonged to the exceptional talents of Steven Rooke and ..."

Awards 
2009 Matilda Awards Winner Best Actor in a Main Role

2010 Matilda Awards nominated Best Male Actor in a Supporting Role

2011 Matilda Awards Winner  for his outstanding body of performance work in 2011 including No Man's Land, Julius Caesar and The Removalists

2011 Matilda Awards Winner Best Male Actor in a Supporting Role

2012 Matilda Awards nominated Best Male Actor in a Leading Role

2014 Matilda Awards nominated Best Male Actor in a Supporting Role

Films

Television

Theatre

References 

Living people
Australian male television actors
Australian male film actors
Year of birth missing (living people)